Carr's is a British biscuit and cracker manufacturer, currently owned by Pladis Global through its subsidiary United Biscuits. The company was founded in 1831 by Jonathan Dodgson Carr and is marketed in the United States by Kellogg's.

History
In 1831, Carr formed a small bakery and biscuit factory in the English city of Carlisle in Cumberland; he received a royal warrant in 1841. Within 15 years of being founded, it had become Britain's largest baking business.

Carr's business was both a mill and a bakery, an early example of vertical integration, and produced bread by night and biscuits by day. The biscuits were loosely based on dry biscuits used on long voyages by sailors. They could be kept crisp and fresh in tins, and despite their fragility could easily be transported to other parts of the country by canal and railway.

Jonathan Carr protested against the Corn Laws, which placed steep tariffs on imported wheat to keep the price of British wheat artificially high. This meant bread was expensive even in times of famine. Carr died in 1884, but by 1885, the company was making 128 varieties of biscuit and employing 1000 workers.

In 1894 the company was registered as Carr and Co. Ltd. but reverted to being a private company in 1908. Carrs Flour Mills Limited was incorporated after acquiring the flour-milling assets. Jonathan's four sons were less skilled at managing the business, but biscuit production remained in the family until 1931. It became part of Cavenham Foods until 1971, when it came into the ownership of McVitie's, part of the United Biscuits group. United Biscuits was sold by its private equity owners to the Turkish-based multinational Yıldız Holding in 2014; in 2016 all UB brands including Carr's were combined with Yildiz's other snack brands to form pladis.

Among members of the Carr family who worked for the business was former Commando Capt. Richard Carr MBE. He was decorated for repeated escape attempts from Italian and German prisoner-of-war camps in the Second World War.

Business
Since 1972 the Carr's biscuit factory has been part of United Biscuits, and the Carr's branded products are marketed in the US by Kellogg's. The factory today is known officially as McVitie's but still known locally as Carr's.

Carr's Flour Mills and the later established agricultural supplies and feeds businesses became Carr's Milling Industries plc, which is still based in Carlisle and now known as Carr's Group PLC. Its products have since the 1990s appeared in UK supermarkets through the Carr's Breadmaker flour range. Carr's Group also own companies involved in light engineering. In 2016 Carr's Group sold the flour-milling division to Whitworths Holdings Ltd.

In March 2012, it was announced that Carr's Table Water Biscuits had lost its royal warrant due to 'changing tastes' in the Royal Households. Carr's promptly licensed the coat of arms of the City of Carlisle to replace the coat of royal arms on their packaging.

Flooding
In 2005 the Caldewgate factory in Carlisle lost two months' production due to flooding.

In 2016 the local newspaper News and Star stated that the factory had reopened with a £1 million government grant. However, that same month United Biscuits announced that the factory in Caldewgate, Carlisle, had experienced five feet (over 150 cm) of floodwater on 6 December, which damaged the brick ovens and would result in product shortages on retail shelves.

After closure of the works for a month to repair and clear flood damage, production and distribution gradually resumed in spring 2016.

See also

List of crackers
List of royal warrant holders of the British royal family

References

External links

Carr's Milling Industries plc corporate site

British brands
Kellogg's brands
Brand name crackers
United Biscuits brands
Companies based in Carlisle, Cumbria
1831 establishments in England